Mohamed Driss (born 1944) is a Tunisian writer, actor, and director of theatre. Since 1988 he has been the director of the National Theatre of Tunisia.

He began his career in 1961 and is, subsequently, an actor, both amateur and professional, a student in Tunis and Paris, producer, and director. From 1969 to 1972, he was an actor and stage assistant at the Théâtre de la Tempête led by Jean-Marie Serreau, of which he wrote:

"À cette époque, j'ai commencé à jouer des rôles secondaires dans le théâtre tunisien, mais la situation du théâtre et mes confrontations continues avec les responsables n'étaient pas encourageantes. Un jour, en pleine dépression, j'ai eu Serreau au téléphone et me plaignais de mon état. Il m'a dit : il est temps de vous lancer dans le théâtre comme un professionnel. Venez joindre ma compagnie théâtrale."

(Rough English translation):
"At this time, I started to play secondary roles in the theatre of Tunisia, but the situation of the theater and my ongoing confrontations with those responsible were not encouraging. One day in full depression, I had Serreau on the phone and complained to him of my condition. He said it is time to get started in theatre as a professional. Come join my theatre company."

He voluntarily exiled himself to France until 1985 and returned to Tunisia in 1988 to lead the National Theatre of Tunisia after Driss wrote Ismaïl Pacha (1986) and Salut l'instit. He took measures to renew the theater of Tunisia and engaged in numerous shows and theatrical projects. However, Driss was also interested in other art forms and, in 2003, he founded the National School of Circus Arts-Tunis, of which he said:

"Le centre est un projet et une décision présidentielle qui sert à mettre en évidence le rôle que peut jouer l'art du cirque dans la culture arabe. Dans ce centre, on trouve le théâtre, la musique, la danse, les arts plastiques et le cirque artistique."

(Rough English translation):
"The centre is a project and a presidential decision that serves to highlight the role the art of the circus in Arab culture. In this centre is the theatre, music, dance, visual arts and circus arts."

In 2005, he founded the National Centre of Circus Arts and Visual Arts and led the 12th Theatre Days of Carthage. Driss also paid tribute to the historian Ibn Khaldoun by writing an opera in his honor.

Works

As director
1986 : Ismaïl Pacha
1988 : Vive Shakespeare
1989 : Le Compagnon des cœurs
2005 : Al Moutachaâbitoun
2007 : Othello

References

1944 births
Tunisian male stage actors
Tunisian theatre directors
Place of birth missing (living people)
20th-century Tunisian male actors
Living people